Hockett is a surname. Notable people with the surname include:

 Charles F. Hockett (1916–2000), American linguist
 Jesse Hockett (1983–2010), American sprint car racer
 Oris Hockett (1909–1969), American baseball player
 Robert C. Hockett, American lawyer, law professor, and policy advocate

See also 
 Hockett Meadow Ranger Station, a location in Sequoia National Forest